The sixth season of Akademi Fantasia premiered on 22 March 2008 and concluded on 24 May 2008 on the Astro Ria television channel. Fauziah Ahmad Daud returned as a judge and was joined by new judge Ning Baizura, who replaced Hattan and Fauziah Latif. The season introduced AC Mizal as host, replacing Aznil Nawawi. The promotional catchphrase of this season is "Bring Out The Superstar Talent In You".

A few major changes were made this season. The show is eligible for Malaysian citizens aged from 18–45 years old, unlike the previous five seasons which were eligible for those who aged from 18–27 years old. The number of contestants was also decreased to 14, from 16 since Season 5.

The winner was 18-year-old Stracie Angie Anam, from Kota Kinabalu, Sabah, who became the youngest contestant ever to win the competition, beating Mohammad Idris Mohd. Zaizizi. She won prizes worth MYR733,734 which comprised a four-room bungalow at A'Famosa Villa D'Lagos, Melaka, a Peugeot 307XS car, cash worth MYR25,000, holiday package of 7 days and 5 nights at South Africa, holiday package to Italy, Sony PlayStation Portable and a trophy.

This season drew an overall 3.8 million votes which displayed a significant decrease from the previous season.

Auditions

For Season 6, the auditions were held in the following cities:
ASTRO, Bukit Jalil, Kuala Lumpur - 12 January & 13 January
Crowne Plaza Riverside, Kuching, Sarawak - 17 January & 18 January
Kompleks Asia City, Kota Kinabalu, Sabah - 17 January & 18 January
Kompleks Mawar, Johor Bahru, Johor - 26 January & 27 January
Gurney Hotel, Pulau Pinang - 26 January & 27 January
ASTRO, Bukit Jalil, Kuala Lumpur - 2 February & 3 February

List of songs during auditions

Songs for female
 Persis Mutiara – Mila AF5
 Rindu Merindu – Fauziah Idris
 Jika Kau Kekasih – Linda Nanuwil
 Ya atau Tidak – Erra Fazira
 Salam Untuk Kekasih – Nadia
 Setiaku Korban – Fauziah Latiff
 Unfaithful – Rihanna
 Menaruh Harapan – Zaiton Sameon
 Akhirnya Kini Pasti – Anita Sarawak
 Pastikan – Siti Nurhaliza

Songs for male
 Langit Biru – Mawi
 Fantasia Bulan Madu – Amy Search
 Kasihnya Laila – Jinbara
 Joget Angan Tak Sudah– Jay Jay
 It’s Gonna Be Me – 'N Sync
 Izinku Pergi – Kaer Azami
 La Camisa Negra – Juanes
 Kisah Kau dan Aku – Alleycats
 Ku Juga Mencintai Dirimu – Saiful
 Azura – Jamal Abdillah

Concert summaries

Week 1 
Original Airdate: 22 March 2008

Guest judge: Ajai

Week 2 
Original Airdate: 29 March 2008

Guest judge: Aidit Alfian

Week 3 
Original Airdate: 5 April 2008

Guest judge: Adlin Aman Ramlie

Week 4 
Original Airdate: 12 April 2008

Guest judge: Adlin Aman Ramlie

Week 5 
Original Airdate: 19 April 2008

Guest judge: Hetty Koes Endang

Week 6 
Original Airdate: 26 April 2008

Guest judges: Adlin Aman Ramlie & Adnan Abu Hassan

Week 7 
Original Airdate: 3 May 2008

Guest judges: Adlin Aman Ramlie & Tiara Jacquelina

Week 8 
Original Airdate: 10 May 2008

Guest judge:  Ida Nerina

Week 9 
Original Airdate: 17 May 2008

Guest judge:  Afdlin Shauki

Week 10 
Original Airdate: 24 May 2008

Guest judge:  Adlin Aman Ramlie

Students
(ages stated are at time of contest)

Summaries

Elimination chart

 The student won the competition
 The student was the first runner-up
 The student was the second runner-up
 The students were finalists
 The student was the original eliminee but was saved
 The student was eliminated

In week 3, the theme of the concert was rock ballad. Additionally, there was a double elimination.
In week 4, the Principal gave a new song to Stacy which was composed especially for her for due to her significant improvement in the past three concerts. However, it was later found out that the song was a cover song by Bob AF2 which is entitled "Cinta Terhalang".
In week 7, the concert was held at Panggung Sari, Istana Budaya. The theme of the concert was original motion picture soundtrack.
Week 8 featured a non-elimination concert. The accumulated votes were forwarded to the following week.

Cast members

Hosts
 AC Mizal - Host of AF Concert
 Sarimah Ibrahim - Host of AF Diary
 Zainal Alam Kadir - Host of AF Diary EXT

Professional Trainers
 Ramli M.S. - Principal & Music Director
 Shafizawati Sharif - Vocal Technical
 Siti Hajar Ismail - Vocal Presentation
 Genervie Kam - Music & Vocal
 Linda Jasmine - Choreographer
 Fatimah Abu Bakar - English Language & Motivator
 Fauziah Nawi - Drama & Presentation
 Anita Sarawak - Stage Presentation
 Jasmi Rejab - Fashion Stylist

Judges
 Fauziah Dato' Ahmad Daud
 Ning Baizura

Season statistics
Total number of students: 14
Oldest student: Hairina Abdul Halim, 44 years old
Youngest students: Nadia Haswani Hasnan & Stracie Angie Anam, both 18 years old
Tallest student: Muhammad Shauqi Naaim Salmi, 6'0" (183 cm)
Shortest student: Nadia Haswani Hasnan, 4'9" (152 cm)
Heaviest student: Mohammad Idris Zaizizi, 172 lbs (78 kg)
Lightest students: Ika Nabila Abdul Rahim & Siti Norsaida Tarudin, both 106 lb (46 kg)
Students with the most collective highest votes: Stracie Angie Anam, 5 times
Students with the most consecutive highest votes: Mohammad Alif Mohd Razali & Stracie Angie Anam, both 2 times
Top 3's vote mean (excluding finale): Stracie Angie Anam - 1.67, Mohammad Idris Zaizizi - 4.0, Ahmad Nubhan Ahmad - 4.90
Top 3's vote median (excluding finale): Stracie Angie Anam - 2, Mohammad Idris Zaizizi - 4, Ahmad Nubhan Ahmad - 5
Student with the most collective bottom two appearances: Lutfyah Sheikh Omar & Hairina Abdul Halim, both 3 times
Student with the most consecutive bottom two appearances: Lutfyah Sheikh Omar & Hairina Abdul Halim, both 3 times
Students with no bottom two appearances: Ahmad Nubhan Ahmad, Mohammad Idris Zaizizi & Stracie Angie Anam

References

External links
 Murai's AF Coverage

Akademi Fantasia seasons
2008 Malaysian television seasons